Sari-d'Orcino (or ) is a commune in the Corse-du-Sud department of France on the island of Corsica.

Population

Sights
Église Saint-Jean de Cinarca

See also
Communes of the Corse-du-Sud department

References

Communes of Corse-du-Sud